The Zehner is a mountain near La Val in South Tyrol, Italy.

References 
 Alpenverein South Tyrol

External links 

Mountains of the Alps
Mountains of South Tyrol
Alpine three-thousanders
Dolomites